David or Dave Taylor may refer to:

Entertainment
 David G. Taylor, producer and director for the BBC
 D. J. Taylor (born 1960), British novelist and biographer
 Dave Taylor (comics) (born 1964), British comic book creator
 Dave Taylor (musician) (born 1953), bassist for Bryan Adams
 Dave Taylor (trombonist) (born 1944), American trombonist
 Switch (songwriter), also known as Dave Taylor, London house producer
 David Taylor (Home and Away), fictional character in the Australian soap opera Home and Away
 David J. Taylor, American visual artist, awarded a 2008 Guggenheim Fellowship
 David Taylor (actor) in The Adventures of the Black Stallion
 David Taylor (writer), winner of the Keats-Shelley Prize for Poetry

Politics 
 David Taylor (Green politician) (born 1957), UK Green Party politician
 David Taylor (Labour politician) (1946–2009), UK Labour Party politician
 David Taylor (Washington politician) (born 1972), politician from the US state of Washington
 David G. P. Taylor (1933–2007), former Chief Executive of the Falklands Islands and Governor of Montserrat
 David James Taylor (1889–1969), Ontario politician
 Dave Taylor (Canadian politician) (born 1953), Alberta politician
 David Taylor (New Zealand diplomat) on List of ambassadors of New Zealand to South Korea

Sports

Football and rugby
 David Taylor (American football) (born 1949), American football player
 David Taylor (football administrator) (1954–2014), General Secretary of UEFA
 David Taylor (footballer, born 1884) (1884–1949), Scottish football player and manager, FA Cup winner with Bradford City in 1911 and 1914 with Burnley
 David Taylor (footballer, born 1889) (1889–?), English footballer for Darlington, Heart of Midlothian and Bristol Rovers
 David Taylor (Welsh footballer) (born 1965), Welsh football player, European Golden Shoe winner
 Dave Taylor (footballer, born 1940) (1940–2017), English footballer for Gillingham, Portsmouth, Yeovil Town, Bath City and Cheltenham Town
 Dave Taylor (New Zealand footballer) (20th century), New Zealand soccer player
 Dave Taylor (Thames Ironworks F.C. founder) (19th century), football administrator
 Dave Taylor (rugby league) (born 1988), Australian rugby league footballer
 David Taylor (Canadian football) in 1986 CFL Draft
 David Taylor (Nicaragua footballer) in 1997 UNCAF Nations Cup
 David Taylor (rugby union), played in 1966–67 Australia rugby union tour of Britain, Ireland and France

Other sports
 David Taylor (Australian cricketer) (1881–?)
 David Taylor (chess player) (born 1941), International Correspondence Chess Federation United States champion
 David Taylor (English cricketer) (born 1974)
 David Taylor (snooker player) (born 1943), snooker player
 David Taylor (wrestler, born 1990), American professional wrestler, Tokyo 2020 Olympic gold medalist in 86 kg
 Dave Taylor (ice hockey) (born 1955), retired professional hockey player
 Dave Taylor (wrestler) (born 1957), English pro wrestler
 David Taylor (athlete) in 1995 European Cross Country Championships
 David Taylor (basketball), former college player for Hofstra University
 David Taylor (ice hockey), played in 2007 Memorial Cup
 David Taylor (swimmer), participated in Swimming at the 2012 Summer Paralympics – Men's 50 metre freestyle S9

Others 
 David Taylor (banker) (1929–2009), banker
 David Taylor (veterinary surgeon) (1934–2013), television presenter on animal subjects
 David Taylor (Wisconsin judge) (1818–1891), American jurist and legislator
 David Dallas Taylor (1926–1983), 1953 FBI Most Wanted Fugitives
 David S. Taylor, CEO of Procter and Gamble
 David W. Taylor (1864–1940), U.S. Navy admiral and engineer
 Dave Taylor MBE (1942-1996), The Wheelie King, British display motorcyclist and road safety campaigner
 Dave Taylor (game programmer), game programmer formerly employed by id Software
 David Taylor (programmer) on World Rugby